La Porte is a city in Harris County, Texas, United States, within the Bay Area of the Houston–Sugar Land–Baytown metropolitan area. As of the 2020 census, the city population was 35,124. La Porte is the fourth-largest incorporated city in Harris County.

When La Porte celebrated its centennial in 1992, it was the home of Barbours Cut Terminal, operated by the Port of Houston Authority since 1977. Fifteen years later, the Port of Houston's newest addition, Bayport Terminal, was established just south of La Porte. The area around La Porte has served an increasingly important role in international trade since the 1970s.

The area around modern La Porte gained fame early in Texas history as the location of the Battle of San Jacinto on April 21, 1836, which ended the Texas Revolution, establishing the independence of the Republic of Texas from Mexico. The San Jacinto Monument, in the unincorporated area of La Porte, commemorates the battle. During the early 20th century, particularly the 1920s and 1930s, La Porte's Sylvan Beach became a nationally known tourist destination attracting some of the nation's most well-known entertainers. As a result of changing economics in the Houston area and beach erosion, the tourist business declined while industrial development in the area grew. During World War II and afterward, La Porte's economy rapidly shifted toward petroleum/petrochemicals and shipping, which developed as the dominant industries in the Pasadena-Baytown area.

History

The community of La Porte was founded in 1892 as a speculative real estate venture by an investment group. A  public space known as Sylvan Grove was reserved by the waterfront. The area around Sylvan Grove soon was developed with amenities including bathhouses, boating piers, and a Victorian hotel with a dance pavilion. La Porte quickly became the most popular tourist destination in the Houston area. Sylvan Grove Park was acquired in 1896 by a company known as Adoue and Lobit and renamed Sylvan Beach. Cottage retreats were built around the waterfront.

In 1900, the devastating Galveston Hurricane hit the shoreline, seriously damaging the community's attractions. As the Texas Oil Boom took hold beginning in 1901, and neighboring Houston became home to many wealthy businessmen, La Porte quickly rebuilt and re-established itself as a tourist center. It was, however, damaged again by a major fire and another hurricane in 1915. The community rebuilt again.

During the 1920s and 1930s Sylvan Beach Amusement Park became a nationally recognized destination, featuring beauty contests and regular performances by famous bands, in addition to a growing gallery of amenities. Some of the most well-known performers of the era, including Guy Lombardo, the Dorsey Brothers, Phil Harris, and Benny Goodman, appeared at the park. In the 1930s the park was completely revamped, with additions of a large boardwalk, amusement rides, and many other attractions. The residential community remained small, supported exclusively by Sylvan Beach tourism and the nearby Bay Ridge community, an area of beachfront summer homes in neighboring Morgan's Point built by wealthy Houstonians.

The beachfront began to physically shrink beginning around 1928 because of erosion from the wakes of shipping traffic, and land subsidence resulting from the extraction of groundwater in the area due to development. Gas rationing in World War II slowed tourism. A hurricane in 1943 destroyed most of the tourist attractions. Most of the damaged structures at Sylvan Beach were never rebuilt after this time, as the area was changing, and La Porte's tourist industry rapidly declined. By the later 20th century, erosion had completely eliminated the beach.

As shipyards and industrial plants in World War II were developed in nearby communities such as Pasadena, Baytown, and Deer Park, the community's residents became more dependent on these businesses. The opening of the La Porte-Baytown tunnel in 1954 further spurred development. The later establishment of the Johnson Space Center in the nearby Clear Lake Area, the Barbours Cut shipping terminal in neighboring Morgan's Point, and the Bayport Industrial District within La Porte's jurisdiction have gradually made the community successful as part of the Houston area's industrial heartland.

Much of the history of La Porte's glory years as a tourist haven has been preserved by the La Porte Bay Area Heritage Society. Plans have been discussed for many years to restore La Porte's status as a tourist destination. A project to restore the beachfront at Sylvan Beach Park began in 2009 and finished in 2013, with sand brought in from other areas and dredging operations. Other plans, including building a large hotel on the shoreline, have been discussed as well.

Geography

La Porte has many small, 1940s, frame houses.

Climate
The climate in this area is characterized by hot, humid summers and generally mild to cool winters.  According to the Köppen climate classification, La Porte has a humid subtropical climate, Cfa on climate maps.

Communities
La Porte contains many communities. Lomax was once a separate jurisdiction, but was annexed by La Porte.

Demographics

As of the 2020 United States census, there were 35,124 people, 12,342 households, and 9,148 families residing in the city.

As of the census of 2000,  31,880 people, 10,928 households, and 8,578 families were residing in the city. The population density was 1,683.3 people/sq mi (649.9/km2). The 11,720 housing units  averaged 618.8/sq mi (238.9/km2). The racial makeup of the city was 81.39% White, 6.25% African American, 0.48% Native American, 1.13% Asian, 0.08% Pacific Islander, 8.52% from other races, and 2.15% from two or more races. About 20.45% of the population was Hispanic or Latino of any race.

Of the 10,928 households,  43.2% had children under 18 living with them, 62.8% were married couples living together, 11.4% had a female householder with no husband present, and 21.5% were not families. About 17.4% of all households were made up of individuals, and 4.6% had someone living alone who was 65 years of age or older. The average household size was 2.90, and the average family size was 3.28.

In the city, the age distribution was 29.7% under 18, 8.9% from 18 to 24, 32.7% from 25 to 44, 21.8% from 45 to 64, and 6.9% who were 65  or older. The median age was 33 years. For every 100 females, there were 98.5 males. For every 100 females age 18 and over, there were 95.0 males.

Males had a median income of $46,118 versus $29,514 for females. The per capita income for the city was $21,178. About 6.2% of families and 7.5% of the population were below the poverty line, including 8.4% of those under age 18 and 11.2% of those age 65 or over.

Economy

The city is located adjacent to three major economic hubs of the Bay Area and Greater Houston: the Bayport Industrial District, the Battleground Industrial District, and the Barbours Cut shipping terminal.

Government
As with the majority of home-rule cities in Texas, La Porte has a charter for a council-manager form of government. The elected council members serve as a legislative body to make policy; they hire the city manager, who is the operating officer for the city. Since 2012, the city manager has been Corby Alexander, from Henderson, Texas. Elections for city council members are held at the same time as for the school board of the city's school district.

The United States Postal Service operates the La Porte Post Office at 801 West Fairmont Parkway.

Harris Health System (formerly Harris County Hospital District) designated Strawberry Health Center in Pasadena for ZIP code 77571. The nearest public hospital is Ben Taub General Hospital in the Texas Medical Center.

Education
The area is zoned to the La Porte Independent School District, including La Porte High School.

Primary and secondary schools include: Jennie Reid Elementary, Rizzuto Elementary, Lomax Elementary, La Porte Elementary, Bayshore Elementary, College Park Elementary, and Heritage Elementary. The secondary schools include Baker Sixth Grade Campus, La Porte Junior High, Lomax Junior High and La Porte High School.

Residents of La Porte ISD (and therefore La Porte) are zoned to San Jacinto College.

Public libraries
The city is served by the  La Porte Branch Library of Harris County Public Library (HCPL), located at 600 South Broadway. The library first opened in 1929. The City of La Porte maintains the buildings and furnishings while HCPL staffs and operates the library.

Old Sylvan Beach Depot Museum and Library, operated by archivist Ann Malone and docent Georgia Malone, the former's daughter, includes various archival materials related to La Porte. The former Southern Pacific Railroad depot is the main building and the grounds also include the original La Porte Library building and a caboose.

Infrastructure

Transportation
Harris County Transit provides public transportation in La Porte.

La Porte Municipal Airport is located in the La Porte city limits.

The closest major airports with commercial airline service are William P. Hobby Airport and George Bush Intercontinental Airport in Houston.

La Porte is linked to Interstate 10 (see map) by State Highway 146, crossing the Fred Hartman Bridge into the nearby city of Baytown; the bridge was built in 1995, replacing the Baytown Tunnel, to allow deepening of the Houston Ship Channel.

La Porte is located on the northwest end of Galveston Bay at the mouth of Buffalo Bayou and the San Jacinto River.

Notable people

 Jessica Boone, an actress, was born in La Porte
 Kerron Clement, Olympic gold and silver medalist (track and field)
 Sarah Emma Edmonds (1841–1898), was a Canadian-born woman who served as a man in the American Civil War under the assumed identity of "Franklin T. Thompson"
 Curvin Richards, was a former NFL player for the Dallas Cowboys
 Shaun Rogers, an NFL player
 Gene Washington, a two-time Pro Bowl player, was raised in La Porte before leaving the racially segregated South to play at Michigan State University, where he was on two national championship teams in 1965 and 1966

See also

 Galveston Bay Area

References

Further reading

 Kearney, Sid. A Marmac Guide to Houston and Galveston: 6th Edition. Pelican Publishing, March 1, 2009. , 9781455608508.

External links

 La Porte-Bayshore Chamber of Commerce

 
Cities in Texas
Cities in Harris County, Texas
Galveston Bay Area
Greater Houston
Populated coastal places in Texas